The King Salmon River is a  tributary of the Egegik River on the western slope of the Alaska Peninsula in southwest Alaska.

Being quite shallow, it is not navigable beyond its lower reaches. Although game fish on the river include king, chum, and silver salmon, the main species are rainbow trout, Arctic grayling, and char.

See also
List of Alaska rivers

References

Rivers of Lake and Peninsula Borough, Alaska
Rivers of Alaska